Tapeina melzeri is a species of beetle in the family Cerambycidae. It was described by Zajciw in 1966. It is known from Argentina, Brazil and Paraguay.

References

Lamiinae
Beetles described in 1966